In organic chemistry, organic anions are chemically heterogeneous substances possessing a carbon backbone and a net negative charge.  Organic anions are conjugate bases of organic acids. The following table lists some of the organic anions and their conjugate acids which are substrates of the organic acid transporter (OAT) family of transmembrane proteins.

References

Solute carrier family
Transmembrane proteins
Transmembrane transporters
Transport proteins